Charles Douglas Winslow (born July 19, 1951) is a former American football wide receiver in the National Football League for the New Orleans Saints and Washington Redskins.  He played college football at Drake University and was drafted in the eighth round of the 1973 NFL Draft.

Early life
Winslow was born in Des Moines, Iowa.  He attended and played high school football at Southeast Polk High School in Pleasant Hill, Iowa, where he was awarded 1st Team All-State honors in 1969.

College career
Winslow attended and played college football at Drake University, where he had earned a football scholarship.  He was named a two-time All-Missouri Valley Conference player and a senior co-captain.

Professional career
Winslow was drafted in the eighth round of the 1973 NFL Draft by the New Orleans Saints.  After playing with the Saints in 1973, he joined the Houston Texans/Shreveport Steamer of the World Football League in the inaugural 1974 season.  The league folded midway through its second season, in 1975.  Winslows then played for Washington Redskins in 1976.

References

External links
 

1951 births
Living people
Players of American football from Des Moines, Iowa
American football wide receivers
Drake University alumni
New Orleans Saints players
Washington Redskins players
Houston Texans (WFL) players
Shreveport Steamer players